Bogdan Oprea (born 29 September 1982), is a Romanian footballer.

Career

He was a youth player at FC Rapid București, but never got a game with the main squad, he played for second side. He later moved onto SC Astra Ploieşti for one season, before joining UCD in early 2007. He was released by UCD in July 2007 and returned to Romania.

References

1982 births
Living people
Footballers from Bucharest
Romanian footballers
University College Dublin A.F.C. players
FC Voluntari players
CS Balotești players
ASC Daco-Getica București players
League of Ireland players
Liga I players
Liga II players
Association football midfielders